Leucocodon is a genus of flowering plants belonging to the family Rubiaceae.

Its native range is Sri Lanka.

Species:
 Leucocodon reticulatum Gardner

References

Rubiaceae
Rubiaceae genera